Piyush Pandey is an advertising professional and the Chief Creative Officer Worldwide (2019) and Executive Chairman India of Ogilvy (agency). He is the recipient of the Padma Shri award (2016).  Pandey is also credited with shaping a distinct indigenous influence on Indian advertising that was earlier under the influence of western advertising and ideas.

Early life and education
Pandey was born in Jaipur in 1955 in a family of eight siblings, seven sisters and his brother noted director Prasoon Pandey. His father worked for the Rajasthan state cooperative bank. He played the Ranji Trophy for the state of Rajasthan. He worked as a tea taster.
Pandey studied at St. Xavier's School, Jaipur and has an MA from St Stephen's College, Delhi. He is a Post Graduate in History from the University of Delhi. He is the brother of singer Ila Arun and Prasoon Pandey. He is married to Nita Pandey.

Career
Pandey joined ad industry as a client servicing executive at Ogilvy in 1982. Sunlight Detergent print ad was the first ad he ever wrote. After 6 years he got into the creative department where he gave several notable ads like Luna moped, Fevicol, Cadbury and Asian paints. Three years later he was promoted to creative director, and then to national creative director. Pandey was nominated to the board of directors in 1994. Under his leadership, Ogilvy India has been ranked the No.1 Agency for 12 consecutive years in the Agency Reckoner, an independent Marketing & Advertising Survey conducted by The Economic Times and Brand Equity. He was also the first jury President from Asia for the Cannes Lions Festival. 

During his 40 years tenure at Ogilvy & Mather became the largest advertising agency in India, and Ogilvy India is considered one of the most creative offices in the Ogilvy worldwide network. In September 2006, Pandey was nominated to the Ogilvy Worldwide board. He mentors creative executives from around the world at the Berlin School of Creative Leadership.

Advertising campaigns and contributions
Notable ad campaigns in India designed by Pandey include:

 Abki baar Modi sarkar - BJP 2014 election campaign, with the famous slogan "achche din aane wale hain"
 Polio ad campaign with Amitabh Bachchan
 Fevicol ad campaigns - Fevicol Bus, Fevicol Fish, fevicol sofa
 Fevikwik ad campaigns such as "Todo Nahin, Jodo"
 Googly Woogly Woosh - Ponds Ad (2010).
 Chal Meri Luna
 Cadbury Dairy Milk ad campaigns like "kuch Khaas Hai"
 Vodafone ad campaigns -  Pug, ZooZoos
 Asian Paints ad campaigns like "Har Ghar Kuch kehta Hai"
 Campaigns for Indian tourism
 Bell Bajao ad campaign
 Anti-smoking campaign for the Cancer Patients Association
 Rath Vanaspati
 Fortune Oil
 Google - Reunion
 The Hindu
 Gujarat Tourism campaigns

He also wrote the Indian patriotic song "Mile Sur Mera Tumhara" for the National Integration campaign in 1988 and co-wrote the screenplay for Bhopal Express.

Books 
Pandey has also written books like

 Pandeymonium (2015)
 Open House with Piyush Pandey (2022)

Acting
Pandey appeared in the John Abraham and Nargis Fakhri film Madras Cafe as the cabinet secretary and in Magic Pencil Project videos (a marketing campaign by ICICI Bank).

Awards and achievements
Pandey has won a number of awards. He was named the most influential man in Indian advertising for eight consecutive years by The Economic Times. In 2000, the Ad Club of Mumbai voted his commercial for Fevikwik the commercial of the century and his work for Cadbury the campaign of the century.
Pandey was voted Asia's Creative Person of the Year at the Media Asia Awards 2002. He is the only Indian to win a double gold at Cannes (for his Cancer Patients Association anti-smoking campaign) and a triple grand prize at the London International Awards. During Pandey's tenure, O&M India won 25 lions at Cannes. In 2002, he won India's first Silver Pencil at The One Show Awards.

He was invited to be a jury member on the 2000 Clio Awards, at the 2002 Cannes Film Festival and was the first Asian jury president for outdoor and press and film at the 2004 Cannes Lions International Advertising Festival. He was invited to judge the 2007 Asia Pacific Advertising Festival Awards. Pandey received a lifetime achievement award in 2010 from the Advertising Agencies Association of India. 
Piyush Pandey won a Clio Lifetime Achievement Award for outstanding work and creative achievements in 2012
The Government of India awarded him the civilian honour of the Padma Shri in 2016.

In June 2018, Piyush Pandey and his brother Prasoon Pandey (Corcoise Films) won the Lions lifetime achievement award of St Mark at Cannes Advertising Festival, France.

WPP agency Ogilvy promoted Piyush Pandey, executive chairman and creative director, Ogilvy South Asia, as its worldwide chief creative officer.

By this move, the company filled up a key position that was lying vacant since the exit of its erstwhile creative head Tham Khai Meng in July. The appointment takes effect from 1 January.

References

External links
 
 Piyush Pndey Profile, Eventfulndia
 Biography of Piyush Pandey on gomolo.in
 Official Oglivy News Document
 Business Standard: Interview with Piyush Pandey
 Brain Behind Brands by Telegraph India
 Piyush Pandey
 Piyush Pandey-Profiles by India Inc
 Silvers of the year, Piyush Pandey, 51

Indian advertising people
Living people
St. Stephen's College, Delhi alumni
Recipients of the Padma Shri in other fields
Businesspeople from Jaipur
Year of birth missing (living people)